Patriarch Sergius (born Ivan Nikolayevich Stragorodsky, Иван Николаевич Страгородский;  – May 15, 1944) was the 12th Patriarch of Moscow and all the Rus', from September 8, 1943 until his death on May 15, 1944. He was also the de facto head of the Russian Orthodox Church in 1925–1943, firstly as deputy Patriarchal locum tenens (1925–1937) subsequently as Patriarchal locum tenens (1937–1943).

Early life
Ivan Nikolayevich Stragorodsky was born in the town of Arzamas, Nizhny Novgorod Governorate in a deeply religious family of an archpriest. Named Sergius after becoming a monk, he studied in Nizhny Novgorod seminary and later in Saint Petersburg Theological Academy. In 1890 Sergius was sent with an Orthodox Christian mission to Japan and became fluent in Japanese (he already knew Greek, Latin and Hebrew). In 1899 he returned to Saint-Petersburg Theological Academy and was appointed its rector.

In 1901 Sergius was consecrated bishop of Jamburg, the vicar of the St. Peterburg diocese. In 1905, Sergius was appointed as archbishop of Vyborg and all Finland. Grigori Rasputin contacted him as one of the first in the capital.

In 1911 he became a member of the Russian Holy Synod. On August 10, 1917 he was transferred to the see of Vladimir and Shuya and on November 28 of the same year, Patriarch Tikhon elevated him to the rank of Metropolitan Bishop. Bolsheviks arrested Metropolitan Sergius in January 1921; after months in jail he was exiled from Moscow to Nizhny Novgorod. From June 16, 1922 to August 27, 1923, Sergius participated in the so-called Living Church (or Renovationist schism), but later publicly repented of his actions and was forgiven by Patriarch Tikhon. He was appointed the Metropolitan of Nizhny Novgorod on March 18, 1924.

Patriarchal Acting locum tenens 
Knowing that it would not be possible to conduct proper elections of the Patriarch upon his death, Patriarch Tikhon had made a will where he appointed three candidates, one of whom would assume the leadership of the Church after Tikhon's own death. On 12 April 1925, 5 days after the death of Tikhon, one of the candidates, Metropolitan Peter of Krutitsy, was elected as the patriarchal locum tenens (Местоблюститель Патриаршего Престола).

However, only 8 months later, on December 10, 1925, Peter was arrested. Foreseeing his imminent arrest, Peter had followed Tikhon's example, likewise appointing three candidates to succeed him. After Peter's arrest, Sergius of Nizhny Novgorod was the only bishop from Peter's "list" who was not in prison or exile at the time. He assumed leadership of the Church with the title of acting patriarchal locum tenens (Заместитель Патриаршего Местоблюстителя), which presupposed that Peter of Krutitsy remained the de jure locum tenens and would return to his duties upon his release (which never happened). Sergius himself was in prison from November 30, 1926 till March 27, 1927.

Declaration of loyalty toward the USSR

Seeking to convince Soviet authorities to stop the campaign of terror and persecution against the Church, Sergius, acting patriarchal locum tenens, tried to look for ways of peaceful reconciliation with the government. On July 29, 1927, he issued : an encyclical letter where he professed the absolute loyalty of the Russian Orthodox Church to the Soviet Union and to its government's interests. In it, he namely stated:

This declaration, sparked an immediate controversy among the Russian Eastern Orthodox, many of whom (including many notable and respected bishops in prisons and exile) broke communion with Sergius. This attitude of submission to the USSR is sometimes derogatorily called "Sergianism", after Met. Sergius and his declaration, and is to this day deemed by some Eastern Orthodox Christians, especially True Orthodox, as a heresy.

Sergius also formed the Temporary Patriarchal Council (later called Synod) which received recognition from the Soviet government.  In 1934, Sergius assumed a more elevated title of "His Beatitude, Metropolitan of Moscow and Kolomna" and in 1936, following a false report of Metropolitan Peter of Krutitsy's death in prison (in fact, he was still alive until his execution in 1937), Sergius assumed the position of patriarchal locum tenens. Despite his pledges that the ROC would not interfere in secular affairs and would be loyal to the state, the arrests and executions of Eastern Orthodox clergy by the GPU and later the NKVD, destruction of Eastern Orthodox cathedrals, churches, icons, seminaries and so on were commonplace throughout the 1920s and 1930s. Before the 1941 German invasion, for the entire USSR, only 4 bishops remained who were not imprisoned or exiled. Likewise, of the 50,000 Russian Orthodox priests in 1918, only 500 remained by 1935.

Patriarchal locum tenens Peter of Krutitsy died in 1937.

Only after the German invasion of the Soviet Union in 1941 did Joseph Stalin finally start to scale back the anti-religious campaign, needing the moral support of the Church during the war.  In the early hours of September 5, 1943, Stalin met with the three chief hierarchs of the Russian Orthodox Church and promised some concessions to religion in exchange for their loyalty and assistance. Among the concessions were the permission to open the Moscow Theological Seminary and Academy, the release of imprisoned clerics, the return of some church property, including the famous Troitse-Sergiyeva Lavra. In return, the Soviet government put the Church under the control of its secret services.

Election to the Patriarchate and death 
Another concession the Soviet Union made was the permission to gather the episcopal council and to elect a new Patriarch. On September 8, 1943, at the council of Bishops, Sergius was elected Patriarch of Moscow. He was enthroned on September 12 of the same year, already being advanced in age (76 years old) and with declining health.

He died in Moscow eight months later, on May 15, 1944.

References

External links
 Сергий (Страгородский)  
 Сергий, Страгородский 

 
 
 

1867 births
1944 deaths
People from Arzamas
People from Nizhny Novgorod Governorate
Metropolitans and Patriarchs of Moscow
Eastern Orthodox Archbishops of Finland
Russian people of World War II
Eastern Orthodoxy and politics
Russian bishops